Robert Bradley Hawley (October 25, 1849 – November 28, 1921) was a businessman and politician from Galveston, Texas, elected as a Republican U.S. Representative (1897–1901) from Texas's 10th congressional district. He won his office in 1896 and 1898 with a plurality, as white voters split between Democratic and Populist party candidates.

Early life and education
Born in Memphis, Tennessee in 1849, Hawley attended Catholic parochial schools and the Christian Brothers College there. After his father died when he was young, Hawley took on the duties of caring for his mother and siblings while still in his teens. He studied law under a Judge Bowman of Louisiana.

Move to Texas and early career
Hawley moved to Galveston in 1875 at the age of 21. He never practiced law however, instead becoming a merchant, importer, and manufacturer in the bustling port city for the next twenty years. On December 11, 1878 he married Mary Drake Rice with whom he had one child, a daughter. He was elected to serve as president of the Galveston Board of Education from 1889 to 1893.

Political career

Hawley became active in Republican Party politics in the waning years of the Reconstruction era, a time when Texas was almost completely dominated by the Democratic Party. The Galveston area was a center of an urbanized population, including many German immigrants and African-American freedmen, groups that favored the Republican Party. On September 4, 1890 Hawley was elected as the temporary chairman of the Republican State convention in San Antonio. He served as a delegate to several Republican National conventions.

In 1896 the one-term Democratic Congressman Miles Crowley chose not to run for reelection in Texas's 10th congressional district, which at the time included Galveston County. Hawley ran and was elected to the Fifty-fifth Congress. A 16 year-old Albert Lasker worked as a reporter on the campaign before moving to Chicago and a career in advertising. Hawley successfully ran for reelection in 1898 for the Fifty-sixth Congress.

In each election Hawley triumphed with less than 50% of the vote, due to much of the white vote being split between the Democrats and the new Populist Party. During his four years in Congress, he was the only Republican elected from Texas.

In office when Galveston was destroyed by the powerful 1900 hurricane, Hawley decided not to seek reelection. Hawley also realized the likely effects of the poll tax passed by the Texas legislature in 1901, which sharply reduced voting by minorities and poor whites. Total voter participation dropped markedly in the state in the early 1900s essentially ending Republican and Populist competition and leaving elections to be dominated by white Democrats. From 1890 to 1910 all states of the former Confederacy passed measures to disfranchise blacks and exclude them from the political process.

He was succeeded by the Democrat George Farmer Burgess.

Later years and death
Hawley returned to his business pursuits in Galveston and helped in rebuilding the city. In 1899, taking advantage of the situation in following the Spanish–American War, Hawley acquired 77,000 acres of land in Cuba and established the Cuban American Sugar Company. He would serve as its president, adding to his business fortunes following his congressional tenure.

In 1921 he was living at 36 Gramercy Park in New York City with his good friend, the artist Arthur G. Learned and Mr. Learned's wife Leila. On the evening of November 27, he was ill with indigestion. Administered a "restorative", he fell asleep around 4 a.m., but was found dead in his bed four hours later on the morning on November 28, 1921. He was interred in Lakeview Cemetery in Galveston with his daughter Sue Murray Hawley Oakes, who predeceased him.

Legacy and honors
Hawley, Texas in Jones County is named in his honor.

In 1899, Jonathan Pierce, the postmaster of Deming's Bridge, in Matagorda County, Texas, successfully lodged to have the post office and cemetery renamed to Hawley in thanks for the congressman securing Pierce's son an appointment to the United States Naval Academy. It has since become a ghost town.

Election results

Notes

External links
 Election results, Our Campaigns
 Obituary: "Robert B. Hawley Dead" New York Times, 29 November 1921

Sources

1849 births
1921 deaths
People from Galveston, Texas
Republican Party members of the United States House of Representatives from Texas
Businesspeople in the sugar industry
People from Gramercy Park
Christian Brothers University alumni